Steijn Schothorst (born 14 October 1994) is a Dutch racing driver. His father Jeroen, his brother Pieter and his nephew Bas Schothorst are also active in Dutch motorsport.

Karting and production car racing
In 2009, Steijn Schothorst finished second in the Dutch Karting Championship. The year after, at 15 years of age, he was declared KNAF Talent First. Later in 2010, he competed in the Formido Swift Cup under the guidance of Tim and Tom Coronel.

Open-wheel racing
2011 saw his first tries at formula racing, finishing third in the Formula Ford EuroCup and second at the annual Formula Ford Festival. That winter, he drove a Radical SR3 RS for Coronel Racing in the Dutch Winter Endurance Series. In 2012, Schothorst was employed by Manor Motorsport and finished fifth in the Formula Renault 2.0 Northern European Cup, after winning two races. With the same team, he tried his hand at the Formula Renault 2.0 Eurocup, finishing 22nd.

In 2013's winter months, Schothorst traveled to New Zealand to compete in the Toyota Racing Series, the country's premier motorsport category for open-wheel cars. By finishing on the podium five times in fifteen races, he scored a fourth position in the championship. Although he won more races the next year, he became fourth again in 2014.

Currently, Schothorst is competing in Acceleration 2014, a multi-day festival combining top class car and bike racing with live music and other entertainment. So far, he has only participated during Acceleration in Monza. It is unknown whether he will enter more races in the championship, for he is also leading the Formula Renault 2.0 NEC championship, and competing in the Formula Renault 2.0 Eurocup.

Racing record

Complete GP3 Series results
(key) (Races in bold indicate pole position) (Races in italics indicate fastest lap)

† Driver did not finish the race, but was classified as he completed over 90% of the race distance.

Complete Blancpain GT World Challenge Europe results

Complete WeatherTech SportsCar Championship results
(key) (Races in bold indicate pole position; races in italics indicate fastest lap)

References

External links
 
 

1994 births
Living people
Dutch racing drivers
Formula Ford drivers
Toyota Racing Series drivers
Formula Renault 2.0 NEC drivers
Formula Renault Eurocup drivers
Dutch GP3 Series drivers
24H Series drivers
24 Hours of Daytona drivers
Manor Motorsport drivers
MP Motorsport drivers
Arden International drivers
Campos Racing drivers
Strakka Racing drivers
M2 Competition drivers
Mercedes-AMG Motorsport drivers
Josef Kaufmann Racing drivers
Fortec Motorsport drivers
W Racing Team drivers